The 2020 Cambodian Second League will be the third season of Cambodian Second League, the second-tier of Cambodian football. It was first started off in 2016 by the Football Federation of Cambodia. The winners from each of the six regions (North, South, East, West, Middle, and Phnom Penh) from Hun Sen Cup are qualified to play in Cambodian Second League. Winner of the Cambodian Second League will be promoted to the Cambodian League. The season was put on hold due to the COVID-19 pandemic but is set to start again in early July.

Teams

League table

See also
 2020 C-League
 2020 Hun Sen Cup

References

External links
 Cambodian Second League seasons

 
Football competitions in Cambodia
Cambodian Second League